Volkmar Kühn (born 27 July 1942, Königsee ) is a German sculptor. Many of his works are exhibited in public spaces, especially in Gera. Heidecksburg museum acquired 60 of his bronze sculptures in 2015.

References

1942 births
Living people
German sculptors